This page lists the songs that reached number-one on the overall Hot R&B/Hip-Hop Songs chart, the R&B Songs chart (which was created in 2012), and the Hot Rap Songs chart in 2019. The R&B Songs and Rap Songs charts partly serve as distillations of the overall R&B/Hip-Hop Songs chart.

List of number ones

See also
List of Billboard Hot 100 number-one singles of 2019
List of Billboard number-one R&B/hip-hop albums of 2019

References

2019
United States RandB
Number-one RandB songs